Christopher Glen Feltham (born 8 September 1972) is an Australian born former English cricketer.  Feltham was a right-handed batsman who bowled right-arm off break.  He was born in Sydney.

Feltham made his debut for Staffordshire in the 1996 MCCA Knockout Trophy against Norfolk.  Feltham played Minor counties cricket for Staffordshire from 1996 to 1997, which included 17 Minor Counties Championship matches and 3 MCCA Knockout Trophy matches. In 1996, he made his List A debut against Derbyshire in the NatWest Trophy.  He played a further List A match against Nottinghamshire in the 1997 NatWest Trophy. In his 2 List A matches, he scored 24.

References

External links
Christopher Feltham at ESPNcricinfo
Christopher Feltham at CricketArchive

1972 births
Living people
Cricketers from Sydney
English people of Australian descent
English cricketers
Staffordshire cricketers